The Texas Tech Red Raiders are the intercollegiate women's soccer team representing Texas Tech University. The Red Raiders compete in Division I of the National Collegiate Athletics Association (NCAA) as a charter member of the Big 12 Conference. The first team was fielded in 1994, and they play their home games at the John Walker Soccer Complex on the university's campus in Lubbock, Texas. Since 2007, the Red Raiders have been led by head coach Tom Stone.

The Red Raiders have participated in seven of the eight NCAA Division I Women's Soccer Championships held between 2012 and 2019.

Current roster
Updated March 1, 2020

Coaching staff

Source:

Conference/National Awards

All-Americans

Big 12 Awards

Season-by-season results

Sources:

References

 
NCAA Division I women's soccer teams